The 2020–21 Almere Sailors season was the first season in the existence of the club. The club plays in the Dutch Basketball League (DBL) and Basketball Cup. The season started under experienced head coach Eric Kropf, who was fired in March 2021. Gregory Tjin-A-Koeng replaced him as interim head coach. The Sailors finished the season in the 12th and last place, with three wins recorded.

Roster

Transactions

In 

|}

References

External links
 Official website

2020–21 in Dutch basketball by club
2020–21 Dutch Basketball League by club